The 1987 Saragosa, Texas tornado was a deadly tornado that hit the community of Saragosa in Reeves County, Texas on May 22, 1987. The tornado destroyed much of the town, killing at least 30 and injuring over 100 people.

Storm event

The storm that was responsible for the Saragosa tornado developed during the late afternoon north of Balmorhea and had very little motion for several hours, moving only slightly across southwestern Texas. By the early evening, it acquired supercellular characteristics, and cloud tops reached 60,000 feet high. A tornado warning was issued for Reeves County before 8:00 PM after a wall cloud was spotted, and a brief tornado touched down near Balmorhea at 8:10 PM.

Initially, it destroyed farms and outbuildings before evolving into a large multiple vortex tornado before entering Saragosa while intensifying sharply into a violent F4 tornado. Twenty-two people were killed inside Catholic Hall of Our Lady of Guadalupe Church, where a graduation ceremony for pre-schoolers was taking place. Eight others were killed elsewhere across the town, including one inside a car.

The worst of the damage occurred inside most of the business and residential area. Trees were debarked and homes were reduced to their foundations. Eighty percent of the town was destroyed. In addition to Catholic Hall, 118 homes, the post office, a grocery store, two churches and a school were also heavily damaged or destroyed. Damage was estimated at about $1.4 million.

Aftermath

The Saragosa tornado was actually a well-predicted event: a severe thunderstorm watch had been issued for Reeves County at 3:45pm CDT, followed by a tornado warning at 7:54pm CDT that evening – at least 21 minutes prior to the violent tornado hitting the community of Saragosa. Local storm spotter TV and radio stations based in Midland, Odessa and Pecos rebroadcast the warnings in Spanish and English, but many residents in the affected region (over 100 miles to the southwest) did not receive them. The town was not equipped with a siren, did not have its own police or firefighters, and as many as 50% of residents did not own their own TV or radio; those who did generally preferred Spanish-language stations based in Mexico (which did not provide weather alerts).

Ultimately, the town's first awareness of the danger came when a parent (arriving late for the graduation ceremony) spotted the tornado bearing down on Saragosa from the west and interrupted the ceremony to give warning in Spanish. The crowd of children and their respective families, estimated to be about 100 people—or about 25% of Saragosa's total population at the time—immediately took cover. As the only concrete block building in town, the town hall/community center would have been considered a relatively safe haven under such circumstances, but it was unable to withstand a direct hit from a violent F4 tornado, collapsing with the loss of 22 lives, a fatality rate of roughly 22% (not uncommon for F4 tornadoes). Still, many local residents believed the timing of the tornado to be a miracle, as it concentrated the town's children in the most robust building in town instead of leaving them to shelter in the dilapidated shotgun shacks which comprised most of the housing in Saragosa (where they would have had no protection at all).

In the years following the tornado, the town church (Sanctuary of Our Lady of Guadalupe Shrine) and the community center/town hall ("Saragosa Multi-Purpose Center") were rebuilt in the center of town along Hwy. 17 with steel-reinforced masonry construction designed to survive an F4 tornado, and a storm shelter was also installed under one wing of the new community center. The town's housing quality has stayed the same, given its continued role as primarily a home for poor Mexican-American agricultural workers; very few houses were rebuilt along the SW/NE damage path through town, with most displaced residents moving in with family or relocating to Pecos, Texas or other nearby farming communities.

Historical perspective

With 30 fatalities, the Saragosa tornado was the deadliest tornado in the United States during the 1980s and was also the deadliest tornado in Texas and in the U.S. as a whole since the Wichita Falls tornado in 1979. During the following years, it was surpassed by the Birmingham, Alabama tornado in 1998 and the Oklahoma City Metro Area tornado in 1999 that killed 32 and 36 people, respectively. The 1990 Plainfield tornado killed nearly as many as the Saragosa event, as did the Jarrell tornado in 1997.

It was the ninth-deadliest tornado in the state of Texas between the Zephyr tornado in 1909 and the Lubbock Tornado in 1970. The community was also destroyed in 1938 by a tornado and was later rebuilt slightly to the southwest.

See also

 List of North American tornadoes and tornado outbreaks

References

External links 
 http://www.stormtrack.org/library/1987/saragosa.htm

F4 tornadoes by date
Saragosa, Texas,1987-05-22
Tornadoes of 1987
Tornadoes in Texas
Saragosa Tornado, 1987
Saragosa, Texas Tornado